The 2000–01 Louisville Cardinals men's basketball team represented the University of Louisville in the 2000–01 NCAA Division I men's basketball season, the university's 87th season of intercollegiate competition. The head coach was Denny Crum and the team finished the season with an overall record of 12-19. It was Crum's last season as head coach of Louisville, ending the longest tenure of any Louisville head basketball coach. Crum also became the winningest coach of the Louisville basketball team during his 30-year coaching career, with 675 wins. Rick Pitino replaced Crum after the season ended.

Regular season
The Cardinals began their regular season on November 17 with an 86-71 win over Hawaii. However, the Cardinals went on a five-game losing streak from November 22 until an 86-70 win over Loyola (Chicago) ended the streak on December 18. They won again on December 21 by a score of 89-86 over Murray State, but lost the next four games between December 23 and January 10, 2001. The Cardinals never won more than two games in a row, with their largest losses coming against Alabama by a score of 100-71 on November 30, and against Charlotte by a score of 106-72 on February 11.

Postseason
On Wednesday March 7, 2001, the Cardinals played UAB for the first round of the Conference USA tournament. Led by Murry Bartow, the Blazers defeated the Cardinals 71-64, leaving the Cardinals with a final record of 12-19 The Cardinals did not play in the NCAA Tournament.

Awards
Louisville distributed the following awards at the end of the season:
Peck Hickman Most Valuable Player Award
Marques Maybin
Most Improved Player
Rashad Brooks
Most Three Points Awards
Reece Gaines
Most Assists Awards
Reece Gaines
Best Defensive Player
Joseph N'Sima
Best First-Year Player
Joseph N'Sima
Rebound Award
Joseph N'Sima
Best Field Goal Percentage Award
Hajj Turner
Best Free-Throw Percentage
Erik Brown
Scholar-Athlete Award
Muhammed Lasege
Most Inspirational Player Award
Bryant Northern
Coaches' Award
Simeon Naydenov

Coaching change
At the end of the season, coach Denny Crum retired from coaching the Cardinals, with the original announcement coming on March 2, 2001. The soon-to-be coach Rick Pitino visited the campus on March 14, 2001. He held his first press conference on March 23, 2001 at 6:30 PM EDT. On April 17, a rally was held commemorating the new head coach. Two days later, Pitino completed the basketball staff.

References

Louisville Cardinals men's basketball seasons
Louisville
Louisville Cardinals men's basketball, 2000-01
Louisville Cardinals men's basketball, 2000-01